The season 1977-1978 was the first season of new fourth tier, Tercera División.

Group 1

Group 2

Group 3

Group 4

Group 5

Group 6

Notes

External links
www.rsssf.com

Tercera División seasons
4
Spain